Ionia, known in Old Persian as Yauna (𐎹𐎢𐎴), was a region within the satrapy of Lydia, with its capital at Sardis, within the First Persian Empire. The first mention of the Yauna is at the Behistun inscription.

History
Achaemenid conquest (c. 546 – 479 BC)

In the mid-6th century BC, the Ionians were conquered by Cyrus the Great and according to Herodotus, they were placed in the same tax district (the first) as the Pamphylians, Lycians, Magnesians, Aeolians, Milyans, and Carians. It is unclear to what extent the Yauna were advantaged or disadvantaged by Persian rule, and what caused the Ionian Revolt which broke out in c. 499 BC and lasted until 494 BC. The main source, Herodotus, puts it down to the personal ambitions of two men of Miletus, Histiaeus and Aristagoras; modern scholars debate what the underlying reasons may have been; arguments for economic and political causes are variously put forward, but there are no clear sources which can give a definitive answer. 

After the revolt was put down, the Ionian cities were subdued by some pragmatic and enlightened measures by the Persian satrap of Sardis, Artaphrenes. The Ionians are reported to have served with the Persian forces which were defeated at Marathon by the Athenians and Plataeans in 490, while they also fought on the Persian side during Xerxes' great Second Persian invasion of Greece of 480–479. 

Autonomy (479–387 BC)

It was only after the Persians were defeated at Battle of Plataea in 479 that the Ionian cities had the confidence to revolt again, defeating the Persian forces at the Battle of Mycale in the same year. 

Soon afterwards, they signed up to a common defence league led by Athens, known today as the Delian League. However, these cities soon came under the domination of Athens. 

Renewed Achaemenid control (387–334 BC)

After the Peloponnesian War and the destruction of Athenian power, Sparta ceded Ionia back to Persia in the 387 BC with the Peace of Antalcidas. Ionia remained under Persian rule until the campaigns of Alexander the Great in 334 BC.

Apart from Yaunas of the plain and sea, there are also mentioned Yauna paradraya (Ionians beyond or across the sea such as Naxos, Thasos and Byzantium) as well the Yauna takabara (Greeks with sunhats, the Macedonians) in Skudra satrapy.

Satraps
1st Achaemenid period:
Tabalus (546–545 BC)
Mazares (545–c. 544 BC)
Harpagus (c. 544 BC)
Oroetus (before 530–c. 520 BC)
Bagaeus (c. 520 BC)
Otanes (517 BC)
Artaphernes I (513–492 BC)
Artaphernes II (492–after 480 BC)

2nd Achaemenid period:
Tissaphernes (413–395 BC)
Tiribazus 
Autophradates (c. 365 BC)
Spithridates (died before 334 BC)

See also
Ionian Revolt
Yona
Skudra

Notes

References

Sources
Ernst Herzfeld, Gerold Walser The Persian Empire: Studies in Geography and Ethnography of the Ancient Near East, 1968, p. 345.

 
Achaemenid satrapies